East & West Steamship Company was one of the oldest locally owned shipping line in Pakistan until it was nationalised in 1974. Its ship,  was the first ship ever registered at the newly established Port of Registry at Karachi in August 1948.  It was owned by the Cowasjee family. The company was restructured as the 'East and West Steamship Co. (1961) Ltd.' from 1961

Directors
The following list consists of individuals who at one time were directors of the company.

 Rustom Faqirji Cowasjee
 Ardeshir Cowasjee
 Cyrus Cowasjee

Agents
The company served as agents for Nippon Yusen Kaisha, Tokyo, Japan and The Great Eastern Shipping Company Limited of Bombay (now Mumbai), India.

Ships

Lost ships
 Fakira was lost in 1956 in the China Sea.
 Minocher Cowasjee foundered on 24 January 1957 in the Indian Ocean.

Burntisland Shipbuilding Company
The penalties imposed on the Burntisland Shipbuilding Company in Scotland for the delays in completion of the Ohrmazd in 1968 proved too much for the Scottish company and caused it to go into liquidation.

Court cases
The company's agent, M.N. Sidhwa was involved in an income tax court case in August 1962, which was decided against it.

Nationalisation
During the nationalisation drive of Prime Minister, Zulfikar Ali Bhutto, the company was merged into Pakistan National Shipping Corporation (PNSC). The owners took this nationalisation to court, whereby the Supreme Court of Pakistan ruled in their favour. The Government assessed compensation at Rs. 97.012 million (2008).

See also

 Cowasjee family
 Ardeshir Cowasjee
 Pakistan Merchant Navy

References

Further reading
 Malik, Iftikhar Ahmed, "History of Pakistan Merchant Navy 1947- 2009" Karachi 2010 (privately published)

External links
 The Ohrmazd

Defunct shipping companies of Pakistan
Companies based in Karachi
Transport companies established in 1947
History of Karachi
Economy of Karachi
Transport companies disestablished in 1974
1974 disestablishments in Pakistan
Pakistani companies established in 1947